Supt is a commune in the Jura department in the Bourgogne-Franche-Comté region in eastern France.

Population

Points of interest
Arboretum de Chevreuil

See also
Communes of the Jura department

References

Communes of Jura (department)